Roydell Williams (born March 14, 1981) is a former American football wide receiver in the National Football League (NFL). He was drafted by the Tennessee Titans in the fourth round of the 2005 NFL Draft. He played college football at Tulane.

Williams has also played for the Washington Redskins.

Early years
Williams attended East St. John High School in Reserve, Louisiana. He was named All-Metro, All-River Parish, and All-State Blue Chip while catching 53 passes for 1,101 yards and 23 touchdowns. He was also All-District in basketball and All-State in baseball. Williams was drafted by the Cincinnati Reds in the fifth round of the 2000 Major League Baseball draft.

College career
Williams owns the Tulane school record as well as the Conference USA career receiving touchdown record of 35. Williams is currently enrolled at George Washington University studying to get his Masters of Exercise Science.

External links
 
 Washington Redskins bio

1981 births
Living people
Players of American football from New Orleans
American football wide receivers
Tulane Green Wave football players
Tennessee Titans players
Washington Redskins players